Thelocactus setispinus, known commonly as miniature barrel cactus or hedgehog cactus, is a cactus in the genus Thelocactus of the family Cactaceae.

Etymology
The genus name "Theloocactus" derives from the Greek word "Thelo" (wart or nipple) referred to the ribs with closely spaced nipples, while  the species name "setispinus" comes from the Latin “seta” meaning “bristle”  and “spina” meaning “thorn, spine”.

Description
The 1 to 3 central spines are longer and stronger, straight and curved like a hook at the tip. This cactus blooms in late summer.

Distribution
This species is widespread in the southern United States in the State of Texas and the Mexican states of Coahuila, Nuevo León and Tamaulipas. This species has spread throughout the world as an ornamental plant.

Habitat
Its natural habitat is arid deserts, distributed widely but has a scattered population.

References

setispinus
Flora of Mexico
Flora of Texas